Gerardo Ochoa-Vargas was born on May 14, 1965. He is a Doctor of Medicine and researcher on emerging diseases and social outbreaks.

Ochoa-Vargas studied medicine at the Medical School (Facultad de Medicina) of the National Autonomous University of Mexico (Universidad Nacional Autónoma de México, UNAM). He has worked in different positions in the UNAM, in close relation with Enrique Piña Garza. In 1994 he was awarded with the National Juvenile Prize on Sciences for his contributions to the field of orphanages and institutional life of children under residential treatment. He was a member of the Transition Team of president Felipe Calderón and became Advisor for the Secretariat of Health, serving the Liaisons Unit headed by María de los Ángeles Fromow. One of the contributors to the National Health Program and columnist of Reforma, Ochoa-Vargas currently lives in the Caribbean.

References

1965 births
Living people
Mexican public health doctors
National Autonomous University of Mexico alumni